Agnes is an extinct town in Lincoln County, in the U.S. state of Georgia.

History
A post office called Agnes was established in 1889, and remained in operation until 1955. The community once had a schoolhouse, now defunct. The community had an inland location away from the railroad.

References

Landforms of Lincoln County, Georgia